The Peasant Workers' Bloc (BMȚ) was a political party in Romania that acted as a front group for the banned Romanian Communist Party (PCR).

History 

In the 1926 elections the BMȚ received 1.5% of the vote, failing to win a seat. The 1927 elections saw the party's vote share fall to 1.3%, again failing to win a seat. Although the 1928 elections saw their vote increase to 1.4%, they remained seatless.

The 1931 elections were the party's breakthrough, winning five seats in the Chamber of Deputies with 2.5% of the vote. The parliament refused to validate the elections of the five deputies and none of them served. However, the 1932 elections saw its vote share fall to 0.3%, with the party failing to win a seat. It was banned in the aftermath of the Grivița Strike of 1933, and did not contest any further elections. Its role as a communist front organization was partially taken over by the Labour League, created a few weeks before the 1933 elections.

Election results

Legislative elections

References 

Communist parties in Romania
Defunct communist parties
Defunct socialist parties in Romania
Communist front organizations